John Leffler (May 27, 1940 - June 11, 2021)  was a former Australian racing driver. Leffler is best known for driving open-wheelers and winning the Australian Drivers' Championship in 1976.

Leffler drove Morris Coopers for many years in the 1960s. He finished second in the 1969 Rothmans 12 Hour Classic at Surfers Paradise driving a Morris Cooper S

In the early 1970s he turned his hand to Formula Ford racing a Bowin P6F in which he won the 1973 TAA Formula Ford Driver to Europe Series. In 1974 he contested the Australian Formula 2 Championship and finished third.

In 1975 Leffler stepped up to the Australian Drivers' Championship (the "Gold Star") and driving a Bowin P8 Chevrolet finished fifth in the series. The following year he secured the 1976 Australian Drivers' Championship title in a Lola T400 with a string of consistent placings but without actually winning a round.

Leffler also co-drove for some of the leading Australian touring car drivers in endurance events. He co-drove with Bob Morris at the 1974 Sandown 250 finishing second in a Ron Hodgson Motors Holden Torana GTR XU-1 and at the 1978 Bathurst 1000 he came second with Allan Grice in a Craven Mild Racing Holden LX Torana SS A9X Hatchback. He is not related to Jason Leffler the IndyCar driver who was killed in 2013

Career results

References 

 Australian Competition Yearbook 1974 - pages 59, 75, 208
 Australian Competition Yearbook 1975 - pages 46, 70
 Australian Competition Yearbook 1976 - pages 65, 108, 117-120, 188  
 Australian Competition Yearbook 1977 - pages 104-110
 Australian Competition Yearbook 1978 - page 115

Australian racing drivers
Tasman Series drivers
Australian Formula 2 drivers
Living people
Year of birth missing (living people)